1470 Carla, provisional designation , is a carbonaceous asteroid from the outer regions of the asteroid belt, approximately 35 kilometers in diameter.

It was discovered on 17 September 1938, by German astronomer Alfred Bohrmann at Heidelberg Observatory in southwest Germany. It was named after a friend of the discoverer's family, Carla Ziegler.

Description 

Carla orbits the Sun at a distance of 2.9–3.4 AU once every 5 years and 7 months (2,051 days). Its orbit has an eccentricity of 0.07 and an inclination of 3° with respect to the ecliptic. The body's observation arc, however, begins the night prior to its official discovery observation in 1938.

Physical characteristics

Rotation period 

In September 2011, a rotational lightcurve of Carla was obtained from photometric observations by astronomer Frederick Pilcher at Organ Mesa Observatory  near Las Cruces, New Mexico. Lightcurve analysis gave a rotation period of 6.1514 hours with a brightness amplitude of 0.25 magnitude. in 2014, two additional lightcurves in the R-band, obtained at the Palomar Transient Factory, California, gave a period of 6.15 and 6.154 hours with an amplitude of 0.24 and 0.25, respectively.

Diameter and albedo 

According to the surveys carried out by the Infrared Astronomical Satellite IRAS, the Japanese Akari satellite, and NASA's Wide-field Infrared Survey Explorer with its subsequent NEOWISE mission, Carla measures between 31.66 and 36.97 kilometers in diameter and its surface has an albedo of 0.051 and 0.062. The Collaborative Asteroid Lightcurve Link classifies the body as a carbonaceous C-type asteroid, derives an albedo of 0.047 with a diameter of 36.94 kilometers and an absolute magnitude of 11.1.

Naming 

This minor planet was named in honor of Carla Ziegler, a friend of the Bohrmann family at Heidelberg. The official  was published by the Minor Planet Center in October 1954.

References

External links 
 Asteroid Lightcurve Database (LCDB), query form (info )
 Dictionary of Minor Planet Names, Google books
 Asteroids and comets rotation curves, CdR – Observatoire de Genève, Raoul Behrend
 Discovery Circumstances: Numbered Minor Planets (1)-(5000) – Minor Planet Center
 
 

001470
Discoveries by Alfred Bohrmann
Named minor planets
19380917